NGC 3628, also known as the Hamburger Galaxy or Sarah's Galaxy, is an unbarred spiral galaxy about 35 million light-years away in the constellation Leo. It was discovered by William Herschel in 1784. It has an approximately 300,000 light-years long tidal tail. Along with M65 and M66, NGC 3628 forms the  Leo Triplet, a small group of galaxies. Its most conspicuous feature is the broad and obscuring band of dust located along the outer edge of its spiral arms, effectively transecting the galaxy to the view from Earth.

Due to the presence of an x-shaped bulge, visible in multiple wavelengths, it has been argued that NGC 3628 is instead a barred spiral galaxy with the bar seen end-on. Simulations have shown that bars often form in disk galaxies during interactions and mergers, and NGC 3628 is known to be interacting with its two large neighbors.

References

External links 
 
 SEDS: Spiral Galaxy NGC 3628
 
 

Unbarred spiral galaxies
Peculiar galaxies
Leo Triplet
Leo (constellation)
3628
06350
34697
Astronomical objects discovered in 1784